Maria Maddalena de' Medici (29 June 1600 – 28 December 1633) was a Tuscan princess, the eighth daughter of Ferdinando I and Christina of Lorraine, making her the sister of Cosimo II.

Life 
Born disabled, she was christened at the age of nine. On 24 May 1621, she entered the Palazzo della Crocetta, attached to the Convento della Crocetta (Convent of the Little Cross, now the National Archaeological Museum), though she never took the monastic vows. When she died, she was buried there.

Aboveground passages 
Maria Maddalena had difficulties climbing stairs. The rooms built for her at the monastery by the architect Giulio Parigi were connected by a series of raised passages above street level across which she could move without use of stairs and, as an added bonus, there was no need to cross the uneven and crowded street. Today four arches of one of these passages remain. They resemble covered bridges or skybridges between upper floors of buildings:
 one opposite the Ospedale degli Innocenti,  
 one above via della Pergola,  
 one above via Laura (to reach another monastery), and  
 one into the Basilica della Santissima Annunziata (where, sitting in a small chamber at the end of the passage, she could watch the mass through a grate in the left wall of the nave). 

This corridor was reminiscent of the Vasariano.

Ancestry

See also
 Passetto di Borgo, Rome
 Vasari Corridor, also in Florence

1600 births
1633 deaths
Maria Maddalena De Medici
17th-century Italian nobility
Tuscan princesses
Burials at San Lorenzo, Florence
Daughters of monarchs